Brunei Computer Emergency Response Team, commonly known as BruCERT, is a computer emergency response team and national cybersecurity organization of Brunei Darussalam. Affiliated with the OIC Computer Emergency Response Team, the Asia Pacific CERT (APCERT), Forum of Incident Response and Security Teams (FIRST) and other international organizations in information technology sector, it is tasked with preventing, analysing, and maintaining cybersecurity in addition to serving as a national research centre for IT infrastructure in the country.

It has maintained a network for coordination with the global organizations to identify cybercrime in the country with prim focus on computer and internet-related incidents within the jurisdiction of Brunei. BruCERT acquires data on information technology and security threats and share acquired findings or detected risks. It makes these findings accessible to the general public for increasing cybersecurity awareness in the country.

History 
BruCERT was established on 1 May 2004 by the government of Brunei tasked with improving the security in coordination with the Department of Information and Communication Technology (ICT). BruCERT is entrusted with dealing with cyberterrorism and security incidents.

Brunei Computer Emergency Response Team is headquartered in Simpang 69, Jalan E-Kerajaan, Gadong, Brunei. Its host organization is the Information Technology Protective Security Services.

References

Further reading 
 

2004 establishments in Brunei
Computer emergency response teams